Tsippi Fleischer (born 20 May 1946) (Hebrew: ציפי פליישר) is an Israeli composer.

Life
Tsippi Fleischer was born in Haifa, Israel, of Polish-born parents, and grew up in a mixed Jewish-Arab environment. She studied piano and theory at the Rubin Conservatory of Music and graduated from the Haifa Reali School, later pursuing degrees in music, Hebrew language, Middle Eastern history, and Arabic language and literature. In 1978 she married comparative linguist Aharon Dolgopolsky and had one son. She teaches at Bar-Ilan University and Levinsky Institute in Tel Aviv.

Honours and awards
 ACUM Prize for lifetime achievement
 Prime Minister's Prize on Israel's 50th anniversary
 Unesco-Paris (Rostrum) Prize for Composition
 Israel's Public Council for Culture and Art Prize for her Oratorio ;
 Foremost Career-Woman of Israel for 1993 in the Field of Music awarded by Globes
 ACUM Prize for Like Two Branches
 Award from the government of Finland
 Award from the government of the United States
 Brahms Gesellschaft award (Germany)
 Canadian Electro-Acoustic Community award
 ACUM Honorary Fellowship (2017)

Works
Fleischer's compositions unite Arabic and Jewish elements. Selected works include:

 Mein Volk (1995)
 Salt Crystals for symphony orchestra (1995)
 Oratorio (1492-1992) for symphonic orchestra, mixed chorus, and ensemble of guitars and mandolas, in memory of the expulsion of the Jews from Spain (1991)
 Like Two Branches, cantata in Arabic for chamber choir, two oboes, psaltery, cello, and tar drums (1989)
 The Gown of Night (1988) magnetic tape piece with the voices of Bedouin children
 In the Mountains of Armenia for Armenian girls, narrator, and clarinet on magnetic tape (1988)
 In Chromatic Mood (1986)
 The Clock Wants to Sleep for children's or women's chorus (1980)
 A Girl Named Limonad (1977)
 Musical after Shalom Aleichem (1975)
 Symphony No. 1 op. 33 (1995)
 Symphony No. 2 op. 48 (1998–2000)
 Symphony No. 3 op. 49 (2000)
 Symphony No. 4 op. 51 (2000)
 Symphony No. 5 op. 54 (2002–2004)

Discography
Tsippi Fleischer's music has been recorded and issued on CD. A comprehensive discography, including streaming and downloading of complete CDs in MP3 format, can be found on http://www.tsippi-fleischer.com/disco.html. CDs include:
 Around the World with Tsippi Fleischer Music from Six Continents, 1997 Series Music from Six Continents, 1991 Series Music from Six Continents, 1992 Series Music from Six Continents, 2000 Series Music from Six Continents, 2001 Series Tsippi Fleischer Symphonies I-V Cain and Abel Israel at 50 Ethnic Silhouettes''

External links
The composer's homepage: tsippifleischer.com

References

1946 births
Living people
20th-century classical composers
20th-century Israeli educators
20th-century Israeli women musicians
Women classical composers
Israeli composers
Israeli music educators
Israeli people of Polish-Jewish descent
Jewish classical composers
Women music educators
20th-century women composers
20th-century women educators
Israeli women composers